Salutaguse is a village in Kohila Parish, Rapla County in northwestern Estonia.

Salutaguse is the location of the only yeast factory in Estonia, Salutaguse Yeast Factory. It was established in 1930 in the Salutaguse Manor.

References

 

Villages in Rapla County
Kreis Harrien